Staying On is a novel by Paul Scott, which was published in 1977 and won the Booker Prize.

Plot summary
Staying On focuses on Tusker and Lucy Smalley, who are briefly mentioned in the latter two books of the Raj Quartet, The Towers of Silence and A Division of the Spoils, and are the last British couple living in the small hill town of Pankot after Indian independence. Tusker had risen to the rank of colonel in the British Indian Army, but on his retirement had entered the world of commerce as a 'box wallah', and the couple had moved elsewhere in India. However, they had returned to Pankot to take up residence in the Lodge, an annexe to Smith's Hotel. This, formerly the town's principal hotel, was now symbolically overshadowed by the brash new Shiraz Hotel, erected by a consortium of Indian businessmen from the nearby city of Ranpur.

We learn about life as an expat in Pankot principally by listening to Lucy's ponderings, for it is she who is the loquacious one, in contrast to Tusker's pathological reticence. He talks in clipped verbless telegraphese, often limiting his utterances to a single "Ha!". He has been purposeless since being obliged to retire, and it is left to Lucy to make sense of the world herself. It is a sad story of frustration that she recounts to herself. She remembers how the young Captain Smalley came back to London on leave in 1930, visited his bank, where she, a vicar's daughter, worked, and tentatively asked her out. She was swept off her feet by the thought of marrying an army officer and dreamt of a glamorous wedding with his fellow officers making an arch with their swords, but life turned out very differently. His job was dull administration, and his early attentiveness in bed rapidly waned. He prohibited her from fulfilling herself by taking part in amateur dramatics. Not only this, but she ranked fairly low in the social pecking order among the white women in Pankot and suffered numerous indignities. A symbol of this retrospection is that their preferred conveyance is the Tonga, a horse-drawn carriage in which they choose to sit facing backwards, "looking back at what we're leaving behind".

It falls to Lucy to navigate a path between her husband's obstinacy and obtuseness and the increasingly pressing demands of India's slow transition to modernity. The question of who pays the gardener, for example, requires the skilful management of human relationships. She also tries to maintain some continuity in her life, through correspondence with her old acquaintances (characters in the Raj Quartet), such as Sarah Layton (now Sarah Perron), who have moved back to England.  It is through a letter from Sarah Perron that romantic fans of the Raj Quartet learn that she did indeed meet Guy again, and they are living happily ever after with their two children, Lance and Jane.

It is clear she blames Tusker for insisting on 'staying on'—at one point they could have retired comfortably to England, but he has been reckless ("nothing goes quicker than hundred rupee notes"), and now she has no idea if they could afford it. She entreats him to tell her how she would stand financially if he were to die. At long last, he writes her a letter, setting out their finances and also remarking that she had been "a good woman" to him. But he also tells her not to ask him about it, as he is incapable of discussing it face to face: "If you do I'll only say something that will hurt you". Nevertheless, she treasures this, the only love letter she has ever received.

Meanwhile, we see the new India that is replacing the British Raj, symbolised by Mrs Lila Bhoolabhoy, the temperamental and overweight owner of Smith's Hotel, and her much put upon husband and hotel manager, who is Tusker's drinking companion. The richly humorous context includes the engagement of servants, the railway service, poached eggs, hairdressing and the church organ. There is an intimate relationship between the Smalleys' servant Ibrahim and Mrs Bhoolabhoy's maid Minnie.

Mrs Bhoolabhoy's greed induces her to trade her ownership of the now shabby Smith's hotel for a share in the competing consortium. She instructs Mr Bhoolabhoy to issue the Smalleys with a notice to quit the Lodge.

On receipt of this letter, Tusker flies into an impotent rage and drops dead of a heart attack. Lucy is downcast and puts on a brave face as she prepares for the funeral and a solitary life. But, at last, she would potentially be free to return to England, perhaps able to scrape by on her £1,500 a year. She is a survivor, because she can adapt, as is shown by the fact that, on the day of Tusker's death, she was about to break a previously upheld taboo and welcome her hairdresser, Susy, who is of mixed race, to dinner. In her imagination, she asks Tusker one last thing – to take her with him, for if she had been a good woman to him, as he wrote, why has he now gone home without her?

Title
"Staying On" was an expression used by British expatriates in India during the latter stages of the Raj. It related to the minority of British officials, military officers and commercial traders who chose to remain in India after spending their working lives there. The more common practice was to retire on pension to Britain.

Adaptations
In 1980, it was turned into a television film by Granada TV, starring Trevor Howard and Celia Johnson, famously the stars, thirty-five years before, of Brief Encounter. This paved the way for the television treatment of The Jewel in the Crown, based on Scott's Raj Quartet, to which it is in fact a coda.

External links
 

Booker Prize-winning works
1977 British novels
Novels by Paul Scott
Novels set in India
Heinemann (publisher) books
British novels adapted into films
British novels adapted into television shows